The 1990 Mid-Eastern Athletic Conference men's basketball tournament took place on March 1–3, 1990, at Greensboro Coliseum in Greensboro, North Carolina. Coppin State defeated , 54–50 in the championship game, to win its first MEAC Tournament title.

The Eagles earned an automatic bid to the 1990 NCAA tournament as #15 seed in the Southeast region.

Format
Eight of nine conference members participated, with play beginning in the quarterfinal round. Teams were seeded based on their regular season conference record.

Bracket

* denotes overtime period

References

MEAC men's basketball tournament
1989–90 Mid-Eastern Athletic Conference men's basketball season
MEAC men's basketball tournament